Locastro or LoCastro is a surname. Notable people with the surname include:

Nikko Locastro (born 1988), American disc golf player
Tim Locastro (born 1992), American baseball player

English-language surnames